Bob Stewart may refer to:

Sports
Bob Stewart (footballer, born 1903) (1903–1965), Australian rules footballer for Richmond
Bob Stewart (footballer, born 1939), Australian rules footballer for North Melbourne
Bob Stewart (footballer, born 1946), Australian rules footballer for Melbourne
Bob Stewart (ice hockey) (1950–2017), ice hockey player
Bob Stewart (umpire) (1915–1981), baseball umpire

Other
Bob Stewart (television producer) (1920–2012), television producer
Bob Stewart (musician) (born 1945), tuba player
Bob Stewart (politician) (born 1949), Conservative MP for Beckenham, former British Army Colonel and United Nations commander in Bosnia
Bob Stewart (communist) (1877–1971), British spy and member of the Communist Party
Bob Stewart (radio presenter) (1939–2019), British radio DJ and presenter
Robertson Stewart (1913–2007), New Zealand industrialist and exporter also known as Bob Stewart

See also
Bobby Stewart, American boxer
Bob Stuart (1920–2005), rugby union player
Bob Stuart (rugby) (1887–1959), dual-code rugby player
Robert Stuart (disambiguation)
Robert Stewart (disambiguation)